Richard Duncan  may refer to:

 Richard Duncan (Upper Canada politician) (died 1819), Canadian soldier, judge and political figure
 Richard M. Duncan (1889–1974), U.S. Representative from Missouri
 Richard Duncan (athlete) (born 1973), Canadian athlete
 Rick Duncan (Richard Joe Duncan), American football player

See also
 Richard Duncan Fraser (c. 1784–1857), fur trader, businessman, farmer and political figure in Upper Canada